Hayden Taylor (born 6 June 1975) is a retired New Zealand rugby union player, and current team manager of the Northland Taniwha rugby team.

His lengthy career ended in 2007 due to a neck injury.

References

External links
 Theblues.co.nz

New Zealand rugby union players
Rugby union fullbacks
1975 births
Living people